Abaera nactalis is a species of snout moth in the genus Abaera. It was described by Francis Walker, in 1859, and is the type species of its genus. It is found in Brazil.

The larvae feed on Cordia panamensis. They chew one or more escape holes near the blade midvein, then link their fecal pellets using silk to form what look like slender brown stalactites suspended from the underside of the leaf. They live within this loose silk tangle. They are yellow and brown and are well camouflaged within their fecula-sprinkled webbing.

References

Moths described in 1859
Chrysauginae
Moths of South America